Game is a 2011 Indian Hindi-language action thriller film directed by Abhinay Deo and produced by Farhan Akhtar and Ritesh Sidhwani of Excel Entertainment. It stars Abhishek Bachchan, Kangana Ranaut, Sarah-Jane Dias, Gauahar Khan, Jimmy Sheirgill, Shahana Goswami, Boman Irani and Anupam Kher among others.

The film is a stylish action thriller and is shot at locations in Mumbai, Samos Island in Greece, Istanbul, London and Bangkok. It is said to be in the same type of genre as The Bourne Identity trilogy. It is similar to Agatha Christie's And Then There Were None. The theatrical trailer was premiered in theatres with Anees Bazmee's No Problem on 10 December 2010. The film was released on 1 April 2011.

Plot

Kabir Malhotra (Anupam Kher) is a billionaire tycoon who invites four people to his island home in Greece, by sending a different letter to each. The four people, who have never met before, are:

 Neil Menon (Abhishek Bachchan), a casino owner in Turkey. He has financial problems with mob bosses that Kabir offers to help with.
 Vikram Kapoor (Jimmy Sheirgill), an actor in India, who suffers with drug, cancer and career problems. Kabir writes to him that he wants to finance the biggest film ever made, and offers Vikram a role in it.
 Om Prakash "OP" Ramsay (Boman Irani), a political leader and ministerial candidate in Thailand. His campaign is under threat of scandal, and Kabir offers to provide new funding to him.
 Tisha Khanna (Shahana Goswami), a crime journalist in the United Kingdom who is looking for her big break. Kabir writes to her, saying that he has a huge story and invites her to cover it.

The four guests arrive on the island, where they are greeted by Kabir's personal assistant, Samara Shroff (Gauahar Khan), who takes them into a dining room that is being secretly filmed. There, Kabir reveals that he has invited them because of their link to his daughter, Maya (Sarah-Jane Dias), whom Kabir has spent years trying to find. Maya was trafficked as a child by OP Ramsay, as an adult brought into the crime world by Neil Menon, and in the end, hit by a car in a car accident and buried alive by Vikram Kapoor. Kabir has gathered evidence against the three of them and invited the International Vigilance Squad (IVS) to the island to arrest them. Tisha Khanna, the only innocent one of the group, was invited because, previously unknown to her, she is Maya's fraternal twin sister and Kabir's only remaining biological child. Tisha rejects Kabir's attempts to forge a relationship with her, claiming that she doesn't want his fortune.

Unable to escape the island, the group await the arrival of the IVS. In the morning, they hear what sounds like a gunshot from Kabir's room. They find Kabir Malhotra dead in his study, seemingly having committed suicide with a gun.

The IVS, led by Sia Agnihotri (Kangana Ranaut), arrive on the island. She watches the video of the previous night's speech by Kabir, but as they are unable to find the evidence that Kabir claimed to have, they let the guests go. Although the case is officially declared a suicide, Sia is not convinced and puts all four guests under surveillance.

Through flashback, it is revealed that Neil was in love with Maya, who saved his life during a shootout at his casino. And also that on the day of her death, she told Neil, through a voice mail that she was pregnant with their child. In the present day, Neil evades Sia's surveillance, and takes revenge on OP Ramsay and Vikram for what they did to Maya. Both are tricked into giving public confessions of their crimes. Vikram commits suicide, and OP Ramsay dies of a heart attack (his medication being stolen by Neil). Sia, who has been monitoring Vikram and OP Ramsay, knows that Neil is responsible.

It is revealed that Neil is also an officer of the IVS. His real name is Major Arjun Singhania, and he has been in deep cover for many years in the Turkish drug cartel. He, too, doesn't believe that Kabir committed suicide, and works together with Sia to find the true culprit. Neil noticed that Kabir was left-handed, yet the gun that killed him was in his right hand.

Tisha, as Kabir Malhotra's only child, is to inherit Kabir's fortune, but Neil and Sia receive news that Tisha attempted suicide. When Tisha wakes up, she tells them that it wasn't suicide, but someone attacked her in her house. Meanwhile, it is found that Kabir has a brother, Iqbal, who is next in line to inherit his fortune. Sia and Neil travel to the missionary where Iqbal lives, but they find him too ill to speak to them. A nurse tells them that Iqbal had a daughter who died, but Neil notices that there are letters sent to him dated after her supposed to death, so she must still be alive.

Neil and Sia travel back to the island, where they confront the late Kabir's personal assistant, Samara. It is revealed that Samara is actually Natasha, Iqbal's daughter and Kabir's biological niece, though Kabir never knew. Neil realised that there was foul play when, at the missionary, he saw a picture of Kabir and Iqbal when they were children, and they were identical twins, so the man in the missionary couldn't have been Kabir's brother. Iqbal reveals himself, explaining that he's been working with Natasha to get Kabir's fortune. Tisha was a surprise they hadn't anticipated, so they had to take her out of the picture. They used Kabir's three guilty guests to deflect suspicion from Samara, predicting correctly that the police would suspect one of the guests as responsible for Kabir's murder.

Iqbal attempts to kill Neil and Sia, but Neil resists, which results in Iqbal being killed and Natasha arrested.

Cast
 Abhishek Bachchan as Neil Menon, a casino owner in Turkey. In reality, Major Arjun Singhania
 Kangana Ranaut as Sia Agnihotri, an International Vigilance Squad (IVS) officer in United Kingdom
 Sarah-Jane Dias as Maya Malhotra, Kabir Malhotra's one of biological twins daughters, Tisha's fraternal twin sister
 Gauahar Khan as Samara Shroff, Kabir Malhotra's personal assistant and biological niece. In reality, Natasha Malhotra, Iqbal Chand Malhotra's daughter
 Jimmy Sheirgill as Vikram Kapoor, a film actor
 Shahana Goswami as Tisha Khanna / Tisha Malhotra, a crime journalist in United Kingdom, Kabir Malhotra's one of biological twins daughters, Maya's fraternal twin sister
 Boman Irani as Om Prakash "OP" Ramsay, a political leader and prime ministerial candidate in Thailand
 Anupam Kher as Kabir Malhotra / Iqbal Chand Malhotra (double role)
 Mohan Kapoor as Karamvir, OP Ramsay's sidekick

Production
This film's title was changed from Crooked to the Game by the producers at Excel Entertainment. Aishwarya Rai Bachchan was initially considered for the female lead in the film. However, a new face and two other actresses were later cast for the film. The film has three major leading ladies. Besides Kangana Ranaut, there is Sarah Jane Dias, and Shahana Goswami, who shot to fame with the same banner's Rock On!! three years ago. The film went on the floors in Mumbai on 15 January 2010. Production was postponed due to Deo's wife's health issues.

Reception
Game opened poorly at the box office and grossed only 65.9 million in its first week and was rated a disaster at the box office. By the end of the run, the film had only managed to gross 73.8 million.

Soundtrack
The film's audio contains seven original songs. The music has been composed by Shankar–Ehsaan–Loy. Lyrics are penned by Javed Akhtar. The film score is composed by Ram Sampath. The soundtrack was released online on the film's official website.

Track listing

References

External links 
 
 
 
 

2011 films
2010s Hindi-language films
Films that won the Best Audiography National Film Award
Indian action thriller films
Indian mystery thriller films
2011 action thriller films
2010s mystery thriller films
Films directed by Abhinay Deo